Jaap-Derk Buma (born 27 August 1972 in The Hague) is a former Dutch field hockey player, who played 143 international matches for the Netherlands, in which he scored nineteen goals. The striker made his debut for the Dutch on 5 November 1994 in a match against Belgium. He played in the Dutch League for HC Klein Zwitserland, HC Bloemendaal, Amsterdam, and HC Breda, and was a member of the squad that won the golden medal at the 2000 Summer Olympics in Sydney. His father Edo was also a field hockey international for Holland.

External links

 Dutch Hockey Federation

1972 births
Living people
Dutch male field hockey players
Male field hockey forwards
Olympic field hockey players of the Netherlands
1998 Men's Hockey World Cup players
Field hockey players at the 2000 Summer Olympics
2002 Men's Hockey World Cup players
Olympic gold medalists for the Netherlands
Field hockey players from The Hague
Olympic medalists in field hockey
Medalists at the 2000 Summer Olympics
HC Klein Zwitserland players
HC Bloemendaal players
Amsterdamsche Hockey & Bandy Club players
20th-century Dutch people
21st-century Dutch people